Pogostemon purpurascens is a small herbaceous, flowering plant found in the Western Ghats in South India. It is in the mint family, Lamiaceae.

Description
Pogostemon purpurascens is an erect branched herb with a 20 cm tall, hairy stem. The leaves are elliptic, opposite with serrated margins. It bears tiny whitish flowers which blooms during the months of January and February.

Uses
It is used as an anti-haemorrhagic (sometimes as a styptic) and antidote to stimulate scorpion stings and snake bites. It is also used to clean wounds.

In Manipur, leaves and flowers are used in the preparation of a local hair-care lotion.

References

 KIRTIKAR, K.R., BASU, B.D and AN, I.C.S; 1975; Indian Medicinal Plants; MIS PERIODICAL EXPERTS

purpurascens
Plants described in 1850
Endemic flora of India (region)
Taxa named by Nicol Alexander Dalzell